Volution Group plc is a manufacturer of ventilation equipment for commercial and residential customers. Based in Crawley, West Sussex, the company is listed on the London Stock Exchange and is a constituent of the FTSE 250 Index.

History
The company was established as a separate entity when HSBC Private Equity acquired the Air Movement and Cable Management businesses of Smiths Group for £125 million in December 2002. It was acquired by ABN AMRO in July 2006 and by TowerBrook Capital Partners in February 2012. It was then the subject of an initial public offering on the London Stock Exchange in June 2014.

Operations
The company's brands include Vent-Axia.

References

ABN AMRO
Companies established in 2002
Companies listed on the London Stock Exchange
2014 initial public offerings